The Tay-Bush Inn raid was a police raid on the San Francisco, California Tay-Bush Inn, September 14, 1961, when 103 LGBT patrons (mostly men) were arrested. It is considered a pivotal event in the history of LGBT rights in San Francisco.

References

1961 in San Francisco
LGBT history in San Francisco
Law enforcement operations in the United States
Tenderloin, San Francisco
1961 in LGBT history